Astra Rībena (born 21 June 1959) is a Latvian luger. She competed in the women's singles event at the 1980 Winter Olympics.

References

1959 births
Living people
Latvian female lugers
Olympic lugers of the Soviet Union
Lugers at the 1980 Winter Olympics
People from Cēsis